Centre is a city in Cherokee County, Alabama, United States. At the 2020 census, the population was 3,587. The city is the county seat of Cherokee County.

History
Cherokee County was created on January 9, 1836, and named for the Cherokee people who once lived in the area. The famous Cherokee chief Pathkiller lived in Turkeytown near the present town of Centre. In 1836 the newly founded town of Cedar Bluff became the county seat, but in 1844 the county seat was moved to the more centrally located town of Centre. The name was chosen, and carries the British English spelling, because of this central location in the county. In 2011, Centre began allowing the sale of alcoholic beverages, and is no longer a dry city.

Geography
Centre is located slightly west of the center of Cherokee County at 34°9'33.052" North, 85°40'29.071" West (34.159181, -85.674742). The city limits extend north to the south shore of Weiss Lake on the Coosa River.

U.S. Route 411 and Alabama State Route 68 run to the north of the city as a bypass, with US-411 leading east  to Cave Spring, Georgia, and northwest  to Leesburg. Alabama State Route 9 also runs through the city, leading northeast  to Cedar Bluff with AL-68, and south  to Piedmont.

Climate

Demographics

2020 census

As of the 2020 United States census, there were 3,587 people, 1,650 households, and 931 families residing in the city.

2010 census
As of the census of 2010, there were 3,489 people, 1,426 households, and 880 families residing in the city. The racial makeup of the city was 87.0% White, 9.9% Black or African American, 0.4% Native American, 0.3% Asian, 0.3% from other races, and 2.1% from two or more races. 1.2% of the population were Hispanic or Latino of any race.

There were 1,426 households, out of which 24.5% had children under the age of 18 living with them, 42.5% were married couples living together, 14.6% had a female householder with no husband present, and 38.3% were non-families. 35.3% of all households were made up of individuals, and 17.6% had someone living alone who was 65 years of age or older. The average household size was 2.24 and the average family size was 2.88.

In the city, the population was spread out, with 19.9% under the age of 18, 8.4% from 18 to 24, 20.4% from 25 to 44, 26.8% from 45 to 64, and 24.5% who were 65 years of age or older. The median age was 45.9 years. For every 100 females, there were 86.1 males. For every 100 females age 18 and over, there were 97.5 males.

The median income for a household in the city was $40,564, and the median income for a family was $44,665. Males had a median income of $43,816 versus $24,043 for females. The per capita income for the city was $20,491. About 14.7% of families and 21.8% of the population were below the poverty line, including 42.0% of those under age 18 and 1.8% of those age 65 or over.

Education
Centre Public Schools are part of Cherokee County Schools (Alabama). Schools in the district include Cedar Bluff School, Centre Elementary School, Gaylesville School, Sand Rock School, Centre Middle School, Cherokee County High School, Spring Garden High School and Cherokee County Career & Technology Center.

The Cherokee County Board of Education provides public education for Centre.

Schools in Centre include Cherokee County High School, Cherokee County Career and Technology Center, Centre Middle School, and Centre Elementary School.

Michael Welsh is the Superintendent of Schools.

Media

Radio stations
WEIS 990 AM 100.5FM (Country; gospel music after 6 and all day Sunday)
WKLS 105.9 FM (Rock)

Newspaper
Cherokee County Herald (weekly)
The Post (weekly)

Recreation
Centre is located near Weiss Lake, a man-made reservoir and self-proclaimed "Crappie Capital of the World".

Transportation and Infrastructure 
Centre is served by Centre–Piedmont–Cherokee County Regional Airport for general aviation, though no regularly-schedules commercial aviation flies directly to Centre. The closest commercial airports are Hartsfield–Jackson Atlanta International Airport and Birmingham–Shuttlesworth International Airport, both of which are a roughly-equal distance to Centre.

No US Interstate highways pass directly though Centre. The closest Interstate highways are Interstate 759 and Interstate 59, which are accessible from the nearby city of Gadsden. Centre itself is served by Alabama State Route 58 and U.S. Route 411; the two roads intersect at the city centre.

Notable people
 John Jonathon Pratt, inventor of the pterotype (1865), an early form of typewriter
 Greg Jelks, baseball player
 Jason LaRay Keener, filmmaker
 John Ross, Cherokee leader

References

External links
 City of Centre official website

Cities in Alabama
Cities in Cherokee County, Alabama
County seats in Alabama